Henabad or Hanabad, also rendered as Hinabad or Haneh Abad, may refer to:
 Henabad-e Olya
 Henabad-e Sofla